Hazlehurst may refer to the following places in the United States:
Hazlehurst, Georgia
Hazlehurst, Mississippi

People with the surname
Edward Hazlehurst, American architect
Noni Hazlehurst, Australian actress
Ronnie Hazlehurst (1928–2007), musician known for his work for the BBC
Thomas Hazlehurst (artist) (c.1740–c.1821), English miniature painter
Thomas Hazlehurst (businessman) (1779–1842), businessman
Thomas Hazlehurst (chapel builder) (1816–1876), son of the above, noted as a chapel builder

See also
Hazlehurst & Sons of Runcorn, Cheshire, England, soap and alkali manufacturers
Hazelhurst (disambiguation)